Sari Qayah (also Romanized as Sārī Qayah and Sārī Qayeh) is a village in Salavat Rural District, Moradlu District, Meshgin Shahr County, Ardabil Province, Iran. At the 2006 census, its population was 60, in 16 families. Based on the census of 2016 there are 11 families left with a population of 34.

References 

Towns and villages in Meshgin Shahr County